Cytaea koronivia is a species of jumping spiders.

Name
The species is named after the locality where the first specimen was collected.

Appearance
Cytaea koronivia females are up to 7.6 mm long. The male is not known.

Distribution
Cytaea koronivia is only known from Viti Levu, Fiji.

References
  (2007): The world spider catalog, version 8.0. American Museum of Natural History.

External links
  (1998): Salticidae of the Pacific Islands. III.  Distribution of Seven Genera, with Description of Nineteen New Species and Two New Genera. Journal of Arachnology 26(2): 149–189. PDF

Endemic fauna of Fiji
Spiders described in 1998
kornivia
Spiders of Fiji